James Michael Marvel (born September 17, 1993) is an American professional baseball pitcher who is a free agent. He has played in Major League Baseball (MLB) for the Pittsburgh Pirates.

Amateur career
Marvel attended Campolindo High School in Moraga, California, where he played baseball. In 2012, his senior year, he went 5–2 with a 1.33 ERA along with batting .456 with three home runs, earning All-State honors. He was selected by the Minnesota Twins in the 37th round of the 2012 Major League Baseball draft, but did not sign and instead enrolled at Duke University where he played college baseball for the Blue Devils.

In 2013, Marvel's freshman year at Duke, he appeared in ten games (eight starts) in which he went 4–2 with a 3.64 ERA in 42 innings. In 2014, he appeared in only four games due to an elbow injury, and in 2015, he did not play at all. Despite this, he was still drafted by the Pittsburgh Pirates in the 36th round of the 2015 Major League Baseball draft.

Professional career

Pittsburgh Pirates
Marvel signed with the Pirates and made his professional debut with the West Virginia Black Bears, going 4–6 with a 4.43 ERA in 13 starts. In 2017, he began the season with the West Virginia Power before being promoted to the Bradenton Marauders in August; in 24 starts between the two clubs, Marvel went 7–8 with a 3.49 ERA, striking out 91 batters in  innings.

In 2018, he pitched for both Bradenton and the Altoona Curve, compiling a 12–7 record and 3.55 ERA in 27 games (26 starts), and in 2019, he began the year with Altoona (with whom he was named an Eastern League All-Star) before being promoted to the Indianapolis Indians in July. Over 28 starts between the two clubs during the 2019 season, Marvel went 16–5 with a 2.94 ERA, striking out 136 over  innings. His 16 wins and two shutouts both led the minor leagues in 2019.

On September 8, 2019, the Pirates selected Marvel's contract and promoted him to the major leagues. He made his major league debut that day versus the St. Louis Cardinals, allowing two runs over five innings pitched. Marvel did not appear in a game in 2020, and spent all of the 2021 season with the Indians, going 7-7 with a 5.26 ERA and 98 strikeouts over  innings. He elected free agency on November 7, 2021.

Philadelphia Phillies
On March 8, 2022, Marvel signed a minor league contract with the Philadelphia Phillies. He elected free agency on November 10, 2022.

References

External links

Duke Blue Devils bio

1993 births
Living people
Baseball players from San Francisco
Major League Baseball pitchers
Pittsburgh Pirates players
Duke Blue Devils baseball players
West Virginia Black Bears players
West Virginia Power players
Bradenton Marauders players
Altoona Curve players
Indianapolis Indians players